Synaptantha is a genus of flowering plants belonging to the family Rubiaceae.

Its native range is Australia.

Species:

Synaptantha scleranthoides 
Synaptantha tillaeacea

References

Rubiaceae
Rubiaceae genera